The Sword of Welleran and Other Stories is the third book by Anglo-Irish fantasy writer Lord Dunsany, considered a major influence on the work of J. R. R. Tolkien, H. P. Lovecraft, Ursula K. Le Guin, and others. It was first published in hardcover by George Allen & Sons in October 1908, and has been reprinted a number of times since. Issued by the Modern Library in a combined edition with A Dreamer's Tales as A Dreamer's Tales and Other Stories in 1917.

The book is a series of short stories. One of the stories, "The Fortress Unvanquishable, Save for Sacnoth", was afterwards (1910) published by itself as a separate book, a now very-rare "Art-and-Craft"-style limited edition.

Contents
"The Sword of Welleran"
"The Fall of Babbulkund"
"The Kith of the Elf-Folk"
"The Highwayman"
"In the Twilight"
"The Ghosts"
"The Whirlpool"
"The Hurricane"
"The Fortress Unvanquishable, Save for Sacnoth"
"The Lord of Cities"
"The Doom of La Traviata"
"On the Dry Land"

Sources

External links
 
 

1908 short story collections
Fantasy short story collections
Short story collections by Edward Plunkett, 18th Baron of Dunsany